Dried meat is a feature of many cuisines around the world. Examples include:
Kulen Slanina Pečenica 
Aliya, sun-dried meat from Kenya
 Bakkwa or rougan, Chinese salty-sweet dried meat sheets.
 Biltong, a cured meat that originated in Southern Africa.
 Bògoǫ, a dried and smoked meat, often caribou, of the Dené people of northern Canada.
 Borts, air-dried strips of horse or cow meat used as traveling food or to last the winter in Mongolia. Often ground into powder and mixed with water to create soup.
 Bresaola, air-dried salted beef originally from the Valtellina valley in northern Italy.
 Brési, made in the canton of Jura and in Jura Bernois in Switzerland and in the department of Doubs in France.
 Bündnerfleisch, air-dried meat from Kanton Graubünden in Switzerland.
 Carne-de-sol, sun-dried salt beef from Brazil.
 Carne seca, air-dried meat from Mexico.
 Cecina, lightly smoked, dried, and salted meat from northwestern Spain (Asturias, León, Cantabria), Cuba, Nicaragua and Mexico.
 Charqui, made from llama or alpaca, in South America.
 Chipped beef, partially dried beef sold in small, thin, flexible leaves in jars or plastic packets.
 Droëwors, from South Africa, dried sausage
 Fenalår from Norway is the salted, dried thigh of a sheep predominantly, but it can also come from other animals such as roe deer, deer, moose or reindeer.
 Hunter beef, a corned beef from Pakistan marinated and baked for use in sandwiches and salads.
Idiyirachi is a traditional Kerala-style delicacy made of pounded and shredded buffalo dry meat.
 Jerky, meat that has been trimmed of fat, cut into strips, marinated, and dried or smoked.
 Kawaab, air-dried, spiced meat of the Hyderabadi community of India.
 Kilishi, a dried, spicy Nigerian meat. Coated with a peanut sauce as well as other spices. 
 Kuivaliha, air-dried salted meat (often reindeer) of northern Finland.
 Laap mei, also called "wax meats" or air-dried meats, are a southern Chinese speciality.
 Lahndi or qadid, air-dried salted meat (often lamb) of Pushtoon Tribe of Pakistan, Northern Afghanistan and Northern Africa (gueddid).
 Mipku, air-dried strips of meat, often caribou or reindeer, of the Inuvialuit people of Northern Canada.
 Pânsâwân, smoked dried strips of bison meat traditionally of the plains Cree peoples of Western Canada and the United States.
 Pastirma, air-dried salted and often spiced meat of in Armenia, Greece, Turkey, and the Balkans.
 Pemmican, a meat mixture, sometimes with dried fruit, used by the native peoples of North America.
 Pindang, dried buffalo meat from the Philippines.
 Po, dried meat in Korean cuisine.
 Yukpo, dried beef in Korean cuisine.
Uppukandam, dried boneless salted mutton from Tamilnadu in India
Sukhad is a dried game meat from Bhopal,India.
 Suho meso, a smoked beef eaten in Bosnia.
 Sukuti, air-dried, spiced meat of the Newari community of Nepal.
 Walliser Rohschinken, air-dried ham from Kanton Wallis in Switzerland.
 Walliser Trockenfleisch, air-dried beef from Kanton Wallis in Switzerland.
 Walliser Trockenspeck, air-dried bacon from Kanton Wallis in Switzerland.
 Walliser Trockenwurst, air-dried sausage from Kanton Wallis in Switzerland.
 Gakhaj, sun or oven-dried meat from Gakh region in Azerbaijan.

See also

 List of dried foods
 List of smoked foods

References